The Majority Coalition Caucus (MCC) was a caucus formed on December 10, 2012, by all 23 Republican members of the Washington State Senate and two Democratic senators. Its membership constituted a majority of the chamber's 49  members, allowing it to take control of the Senate from the Democratic caucus whose members had previously formed a majority. The MCC, operating much like a coalition government, offered an equal number of committee leadership positions to Republicans and Democrats. Senate Democrats accepted only three of the nine positions offered them. The Republicans strengthened their position by gaining one seat in the 2013 election, but lost its majority following a special election in November 2017. The coalition has 23 Republicans and one self-identified Democratic senator, Tim Sheldon. On November 15, 2017 the Majority Coalition Caucus returned to being the state Senate Republican Caucus.

Formation and organization
In the November 2012 elections, Republicans gained one seat in the Washington State Senate, reducing the Democratic majority to 26 out of 49 seats. On December 10, 2012, two Democratic state senators, Tim Sheldon and Rodney Tom, announced they would caucus with the Republicans to create a Republican Majority Caucus with 25 of 49 seats.

The MCC has the power to appoint the chairpersons and members of the twelve policy and three fiscal committees that play a leading role in considering and advancing legislation, much like U.S. Senate committees. The MCC proposed six Republican chairs and six Democratic chairs and co-chairs drawn from both parties for the remaining committees.

Senate Democrats rejected offers to chair or co-chair any committees offered them except three: Steve Hobbs chaired the Financial Institutions & Insurance Committee, Brian Hatfield chaired the Agriculture, Water & Rural Economic Development Committee, and Tracey Eide co-chaired the Transportation Committee with Curtis King. However, by December 2014 Hobbs, Hatfield, and Eide's roles had been reduced to "ranking minority member" on each of their committees in favor of Republican leadership.

The MCC's two Democratic members were given leadership positions: Rodney Tom was Senate Majority Leader, Tim Sheldon (MCC) was the President Pro Tempore of the Senate. Republican Mark Schoesler headed the Senate Republican Caucus, which continued to operate even while all its members belong as well to the MCC.

The election of Republican Jan Angel in 2013 to the Senate gave the MCC 26 of the 49 seats. Rodney Tom characterized this as an "exponential" increase in the coalition's leverage.

In the 2014 election Rodney Tom decided not to seek re-election because of family problems. However, the caucus maintained its majority with 26 senators.

The Majority Coalition Caucus lost its majority in the 2017 special election, which saw the election of Democrat Manka Dhingra. On 15 November 2017 the Majority Coalition Caucus was dissolved and all of its members rejoined the Senate Republican Caucus; despite being registered as a Democrat, Tim Sheldon continued to caucus with Republicans.

In the 2018 election, Washington Democratic Party regained its majority in the Senate, electing 28 seats.

Composition

Majority Coalition Caucus-Led Committees

List of MCC members

Originally appointed
†Originally Elected in Special Election

Responses
Most local media initially responded with cautious optimism to the announced coalition, though a columnist in the Spokesman-Review responded with skepticism. Democratic leaders denounced the MCC as "the exact opposite of collaboration" and denied that it was bi-partisan.

See also
Washington State Legislature
Independent Democratic Conference

References

External links
Official Announcement
Video of News Conference Announcing Senate Coalition
Governing Principles of the Coalition Caucus
Coalition Committee Structure

Washington State Legislature
Government of Washington (state)